James E. Fitzpatrick (July 9, 1908 – February 28, 1967) was an American politician who served as the 32nd Mayor of Burlington, Vermont.

Life

James E. Fitzpatrick was born in Burlington, Vermont, on July 9, 1908, to Thomas W. Fitzpatrick and Mary E. Malloy.

On January 4, 1946, he was given the Democratic nomination for Ward Four's alderman seat and was elected without opposition. He would continue to serve on the board for thirteen years and during that time was elected as president of the board of aldermen.

On February 3, 1959, he announced his candidacy for Burlington's mayoralty and was given the Democratic nomination on February 7. Incumbent Republican Mayor C. Douglas Cairns chose to not run for reelection and Fitzpatrick defeated Paul C. Dorn in a landslide by 994 votes with 4,920 votes to 3,926 votes. During his tenure he and the board of alderman signed a petition asking President Eisenhower to review the order that would close the Ethan Allen Air Force Base. On March 7 Robert K. Bing unexpectedly defeated Fitzpatrick with 4,953 votes to 4,024 votes despite having never held an elected office nor being involved in city politics prior to the mayoral race.

On September 11, 1961, Fitzpatrick was appointed to Burlington's airport commission against the will of Mayor Bing and would continue to serve on the commission until his death. On June 24, 1964, he won the endorsement of the Chittenden County Democratic Committee to succeed John J. Burns as postmaster of Burlington, but never took the civil service examine and on August 25, 1965, announced that he would not accept the congressional appointment to the postmaster office. In 1967 he talked about the possibility of him returning to the board of aldermen, but on February 28, 1967, he suffered a heart attack and died.

References

|-

|-

|-

1908 births
1967 deaths
Mayors of Burlington, Vermont
Vermont Democrats
20th-century American politicians